Duck foot or duck's foot may refer to:
Duck foot, alternative name for club foot (furniture)
Duck's foot, type of 19th-century volley gun
Duckfeet, or splayfeet, a deformity in which the feet are abnormally flat and turned outwards.